The Day the World Broke is an adventure/puzzle game released by Houghton Mifflin Interactive in 1997. In the game, the player explores a city located in the Earth's core, achieving game goals primarily through conversations with the city's part animal part machine inhabitants. While the environments are hand-painted, the Mechanimals are sometimes rendered in 3D computer graphics, and the human characters in live action.

References

Adventure games
1997 video games
Puzzle video games
Video games developed in the United States
Windows games
Windows-only games